Clepsimorpha is a genus of moths in the family Gelechiidae. It contains only one species, Clepsimorpha inconspicua, which is found in South Africa.

References

Endemic moths of South Africa
Anomologinae